The Collegian may refer to:

Publications
 Daily Collegian (Pennsylvania State University)
 The Massachusetts Daily Collegian
 The Collegian (San Joaquin Delta College)
 The Collegian (Hillsdale College)
 The Collegian (Houston Baptist University)
 The Collegian (Kansas State University)
 The Collegian (La Salle University)
 The Collegian (Lorain County Community College)
 The Collegian (Mississippi College)
 The Collegian (Stewart's Melville College)
 The Collegian (Morton College)
 The Collegian (University of Richmond)
 University of Tulsa Collegian
 The Collegian (University of Texas at Brownsville)
 The Collegian (Walla Walla College)
 The Collegian (Willamette University), college newspaper of Willamette University
 The student newspaper publication at Baltimore City College
 The Collegian (California State University, Fresno)
 The Independent Collegian, University of Toledo student newspaper formerly known as The Collegian
 The student newspaper publication at Macleans College

Films
The Collegians, a 1926 film series directed by Wesley Ruggles